Kwang-hee is a Korean unisex given name. The meaning depends on the hanja used to write each syllable of the name. There are 13 hanja with the reading "kwang" and 24 hanja with the reading "hee" on the South Korean government's official list of hanja which may be used in given names.

People with this name include:
Lee Kwang-hee (born 1960), South Korean physicist
Choi Kwang-hee (volleyball) (born 1974), South Korean volleyball player
Choi Kwang-hee (born 1984), South Korean football player
Hwang Kwanghee (born 1988), South Korean singer, member of boyband ZE:A
Cho Kwang-hee (born 1993), South Korean sprint canoeist
Heo Kwang-hee (born 1995), South Korean badminton player

See also
List of Korean given names

References

Korean unisex given names